Zago may refer to:

Zago (character), from the Zago, Jungle Prince comic books
Zago (surname), an Italian surname, including a list of persons with the surname